Tyler Stites (born March 18, 1998) is an American racing cyclist, who currently rides for Project Echelon Racing. In May 2019, he led the Young Rider Classification following the conclusion of Stage 1 of the 2019 Tour of California.

Major results
2016
 1st Stage 2 Tour de l'Abitibi
2017
 1st Prologue (TTT) Tour Alsace
2018
 1st Prologue (TTT) Tour Alsace
2019
 5th Overall Tour of the Gila
 7th Overall Joe Martin Stage Race
2021
 4th Overall Joe Martin Stage Race
1st Stage 2
2022
 1st Redlands Bicycle Classic
 2nd Road race, National Road Championships
 10th Overall Tour of the Gila
1st Stages 2 & 4

References

External links
 

1998 births
Living people
American male cyclists
Sportspeople from Tucson, Arizona